Joseph Walker was a U.S. lawyer and politician who served as the Speaker of the Massachusetts House of Representatives from 1909 to 1911.

Early life
Walker was born on July 13, 1865, in Worcester, Massachusetts, to Joseph H. Walker and Hannah M. (Kelly) Walker. His father was a member of the United States House of Representatives from 1889 to 1899.

Walker earned degrees from Phillips Exeter Academy, Brown University, Harvard College, and Harvard Law School. He was admitted to the Suffolk County bar in 1889.

Politics
Walker was a member of the Brookline School Committee from 1897 to 1903. He also served on the Town Committee and was a Republican State Committeeman.

In 1904 Walker was elected to the Massachusetts House of Representatives. He served as chairman of the House Rules, Ways, and Means Committee, the special State Accounts Committee, and the Railroads Committee. In 1909 he was elected Speaker of the House.

Walker was a candidate for Governor of Massachusetts in 1911, but lost the Republican nomination to Lieutenant Governor Louis A. Frothingham. He ran again in 1912, but lost in the general election to Governor Eugene Foss. He ran a third time in 1914 as a member of the Progressive Party. He finished in third place with 7.02% of the vote.

Death
Walker died on November 26, 1941, at the Phillips House of the Massachusetts General Hospital.

See also
 130th Massachusetts General Court (1909)
 131st Massachusetts General Court (1910)

References

1865 births
1941 deaths
Brown University alumni
Harvard Law School alumni
Phillips Exeter Academy alumni
Politicians from Brookline, Massachusetts
Politicians from Worcester, Massachusetts
Speakers of the Massachusetts House of Representatives
Massachusetts lawyers
Republican Party members of the Massachusetts House of Representatives
Massachusetts Progressives (1912)
Harvard College alumni